Glenda Ritz (born 1954) is the former Superintendent of Public Instruction for Indiana. She was elected November 6, 2012, defeating incumbent Superintendent Tony Bennett in an upset election, and she took office with a state government dominated by Republicans who opposed her agenda and could block it. Among Indiana Democrats, she held the highest elected office in state government during her term of office. She is the first Democrat to serve in the office in 40 years and the first Democrat to win any down ballot race in the state since 1996.

On June 4, 2015, Ritz declared she would run for governor in 2016.  On August 7, 2015, Ritz announced that she would no longer seek the nomination for governor, but rather seek re-election for Superintendent of Public Instruction.  John R. Gregg, the Democratic nominee for governor, pledged to support her re-election effort. Ritz was defeated by Republican challenger Jennifer McCormick.

Early life and education
Glenda Sue Neubauer was born in Lafayette, Indiana, to Mr. and Mrs. James L. Neubauer. She graduated with the class of '72 at Jefferson High School. She holds bachelor's and master's degrees in education from Ball State University, and received a second master's degree in library science from Indiana University – Purdue University Indianapolis. She has been married to Gary Ritz of Pendleton, Indiana, since 1977, and he is a partner at Paragus, which operates in real estate development, construction and property management. The couple resides in Carmel, Indiana, and has two adult sons, named Brandon and Philip.

Early career
Before her statewide political career, Ritz was an educator and library media specialist for 33 years, and her last position was at the Crooked Creek Elementary School in Metropolitan School District of Washington Township. She won teacher of the year awards at two different schools, and in 2012 she was one of 155 nationally board certified teachers in the state of Indiana. She served as a member of the National Board for Professional Teaching Standards, a board member of the Indiana State Teachers Association and president of the Washington Township local ISTA union, and president of the Washington Township Education Association for 15 years.

Indiana Superintendent of Public Instruction

2012 election
Originally a registered Republican, Glenda Ritz switched party registration in 2008 and ran as the Democratic nominee against first-term incumbent Tony Bennett to become the next Superintendent of Public Instruction in 2012. Ritz was seen as an underdog with Bennett enjoying a substantial fundraising advantage and support of many prominent Republican officials. She called the election a "referendum" on Bennett's reforms during his first term in office, which included grading schools A-F, closing failed schools, merit pay, employing standardized test results as a form of teacher evaluation, using pass-fail standardized reading tests, supporting Common Core, developing charter schools, and giving out vouchers that could be used at private schools. A member of the ISTA, Ritz had solid support from teachers and used that network and social media to expand her base. She was endorsed by Democratic gubernatorial candidate John R. Gregg. Bennett won the counties around Marion County, but Ritz took the larger Marion and Madison counties by a landslide. Ritz won the election in an upset, capturing 52 percent of the vote. Newly elected Governor Mike Pence received fewer votes than Ritz in the general election.

Indiana 2012 Superintendent of Public Instruction Election

2016 election

Ritz was defeated in the 2016 general election by Jennifer McCormick.

Tenure
Ritz took office on January 19, 2013. As a member of the ISTA, she signed on to the 2011 court case against vouchers, but after her election in 2012, she removed her name so as not to have a conflict of interest in the case when she took office. The Indiana Supreme Court ruled unanimously in March 2013 that the vouchers were constitutional. In one of his first acts as governor, Mike Pence removed Ritz from control of the Educational Employment Relations Board, which is in charge of handling conflicts between unions and school boards. As Ritz assumed the chair of the Indiana State Board of Education, she clashed with politically-appointed members. In 2013, the Republican-controlled legislature budgeted and Governor Pence used his executive authority to create the Center for Education and Career Innovation, which duplicated some of the Superintendent's staff work for state board. CECI initiated a plan to remove Ritz from the state board by removing the superintendent from the chair position. In 2014, Indiana became the first state to pull out of the Common Core standards with the support of the state legislature, Gov. Pence, and endorsed by Ritz and the legislature authorized Ritz to oversee the development of new standards. Pence and Ritz were able to agree on the new standards. New tests were created for those standards and also the federally mandated standards pushed by Pence, which resulted in 12-hours of standardized testing. Controversy developed over who was responsible for length of the testing time with the Governor of Indiana blaming Ritz and Ritz responding that it was due to Pence's demand that the federally mandated standards be included. Pence ordered the tests halved but did not have the authority. The House agreed to reduce the test by a fourth and the Indiana Department of Education implemented the changes. In 2014, Ritz also opposed the Republicans push to create a fast track for teacher certification saying that the standards for licensing should be kept rigorous. This was passed by the state legislature and signed by Gov. Pence. On January 29, 2015, Indiana's House Education Committee voted in favor of allowing the State Board of Education to elect its own chair rather than be headed by the Superintendent of Public Instruction. At the time, Ritz refused to speculate whether she would remain chair but expressed that the electorate gave her a mandate to do that job. Ritz made a short statement at the debate: "The Indiana Superintendent of Public Instruction has held the position of chair of the State Board of Education for over 100 years. Indiana chose to have its highest-ranking elected authority on education be the chair and the 2012 elected Superintendent should be afforded this role." In the Senate, Senate President Pro Tem David Long (R-Fort Wayne) explained her removal by saying, "In all fairness, Superintendent Ritz was a librarian, okay?” and other Republican senators questioning her credentials to be state superintendent. Gov. Pence signed the legislation authorizing the state board to elect its chair and taking effect in 2017.

2016 gubernatorial campaign

Ritz launched her gubernatorial race on June 4, 2015, following the announcements of John Gregg and Karen Tallian. At her announcement, Ritz said that education and the economy would be the centerpiece of her campaign platform. While reaching out to potential supporters, she was rebuffed by at least one Democrat and labor representative, David Frye, because her husband's company, Pegasus, is a non-union construction company, although labor supported her previously. Ritz was expected to get the support of the ISTA, which is the teachers' union.
Glenda Ritz officially ended her gubernatorial campaign on August 7.

References

External links

Official Superintendent site
Superintendent campaign site
Governor campaign site

1954 births
Living people
Ball State University alumni
Educators from Indiana
American women educators
Indiana Democrats
Indiana Republicans
Indiana University alumni
Politicians from Indianapolis
Superintendents of Public Instruction of Indiana
Women in Indiana politics
21st-century American women